Modern pentathlon was first contested at the Olympic Games at the 1912 Summer Olympics in Stockholm. The sport was invented by Baron Pierre de Coubertin, the founder of the modern Olympic Games.

A lost points system was used, in which the athlete lost the same number of points corresponding to his position in each modality. Thus, the first position resulted in 1 Lost Point, the second position 2 Lost Points, and so on. At the end, the classification was obtained by adding up the lost points, and the placements were assigned in ascending order of the number of points lost by each competitor.

Participating nations

A total of 32 athletes from 11 nations competed at the Stockholm Games:

Results

Shooting

Swimming

Fencing

Equestrian

Athletics

References

External links
 
 
 

 
1912 Summer Olympics events
1912